Ervin-Ernst-Friedrich Thomson (23 July 1867 – 17 June 1932 Tallinn) was an Estonian politician. He was a member of IV Riigikogu. He was a member of the Riigikogu since 22 January 1930. He replaced Hans Pöhl. On 27 January 1930, he resigned his position and he was replaced by Erich Friedrich Carl Walter.

References

1867 births
1932 deaths
Baltic-German people
German-Baltic Party politicians
Members of the Riigikogu, 1929–1932